The untitled Godzilla vs. Kong sequel is an upcoming American monster film directed by Adam Wingard. A sequel to Godzilla vs. Kong (2021), it will be the fifth film in Legendary Pictures' MonsterVerse, the 38th film in the Godzilla franchise, the 13th film in the King Kong franchise, and the fifth Godzilla film to be completely produced by an American film studio. 

Due to the box office and streaming success of Godzilla vs. Kong during the COVID-19 pandemic, Legendary announced a sequel in March 2022 and that filming would commence later in the year. In May 2022, it was announced that Wingard would return to direct and Dan Stevens cast as the lead. Filming began in July 2022 in Gold Coast, Queensland and wrapped in November 2022. 

The film is scheduled to be released on March 15, 2024.

Synopsis

Cast
 Dan Stevens
 Rebecca Hall as Dr. Ilene Andrews
 Brian Tyree Henry as Bernie Hayes
 Kaylee Hottle as Jia
 Fala Chen 
 Alex Ferns 
 Rachel House

Production

Development
In March 2019, producer Alex Garcia stated that Legendary hoped to produce more MonsterVerse films if they became successful, stating, "It's one brick at a time, each piece has to be as good as it can be, so right now it's all focused on this [Godzilla: King of the Monsters and Godzilla vs. Kong]. But could there be? Yeah, that's the hope if the movies turn out really well." In February 2021, Wingard commented on the future of the MonsterVerse, "I know where we could go potentially with future films." However, he noted that the MonsterVerse was created "to a certain degree" to lead towards Godzilla vs. Kong. He added that the MonsterVerse is at a "crossroads", stating, "It's really at the point where audiences have to kind of step forward and vote for more of these things. If this movie is a success obviously they will continue forward."

Godzilla vs. Kong was released on March 24, 2021 and became a box office and streaming hit during the COVID-19 pandemic. The film grossed $470 million worldwide against a break-even point of $330 million and became the most pirated film of 2021. On April 4, 2021, Legendary's CEO Josh Grode commented on potential sequels, "we have a number of ideas for more movies." That same day, the hashtag #ContinueTheMonsterVerse began trending on Twitter, which was acknowledged by Legendary and garnered support from Jordan Vogt-Roberts (director of Kong: Skull Island). On April 27, 2021, The Hollywood Reporter stated that Legendary was "quietly taking steps to stretch the series into one or more installments," while negotiating with Wingard to potentially return to direct. Various ideas were considered, with Son of Kong being one potential title. In August 2021, MonsterVerse writer Max Borenstein stated that "there will be some new, interesting installments coming" due to the success of Godzilla vs. Kong.

On March 20, 2022, it was announced that a sequel to Godzilla vs. Kong was scheduled to commence filming later in the year in Gold Coast, Queensland and other locations in South East Queensland. In May 2022, it was announced that Wingard would return to direct and that Dan Stevens had been cast in the lead. Wingard and Stevens had previously worked together on The Guest. On May 19, 2022, Production Weekly reported that the film's working title is Origins. On June 30, 2022, it was revealed that Mary Parent, Alex Garcia, Eric McLeod, Brian Rogers, Thomas Tull and Jon Jashni would return to produce. On July 1, 2022, Toho Co., Ltd. confirmed that the film would feature Godzilla.

In August 2022, Warner Bros. and Legendary announced a new synopsis and that Rebecca Hall, Brian Tyree Henry and Kaylee Hottle would reprise their roles from Godzilla vs Kong while Fala Chen, Alex Ferns and Rachel House would join the cast as well. It was also revealed that Wingard would collaborate once more with production designer Tom Hammock, editor Josh Schaeffer, composer Tom Holkenborg, and that Terry Rossio had returned to write the script with Jeremy Slater and Simon Barrett.

Filming
Principal photography commenced in Gold Coast, Queensland on July 29, 2022. At the start of production, Ben Seresin was confirmed to have returned as director of photography. In November 2022, it was reported that filming had wrapped in Australia and that crew gear revealed the film's potential title as Godzilla and Kong.

Music 
On August 25, 2022, Tom Holkenborg was announced to return to compose the film's score, after previously doing so for Godzilla vs. Kong.

Release
The film is scheduled to be theatrically released on March 15, 2024 in IMAX.

Notes

References

Sources

External links
 

2020s American films
2020s English-language films
2020s monster movies
2024 science fiction action films
Action crossover films
American crossover films
American monster movies
American science fiction action films
American sequel films
Films directed by Adam Wingard
Films produced by Thomas Tull
Films scored by Junkie XL
Films shot on the Gold Coast, Queensland
Godzilla films
King Kong (franchise) films
Legendary Pictures films
MonsterVerse films
Science fiction crossover films

Upcoming English-language films
Upcoming sequel films
Upcoming IMAX films

Films with screenplays by Terry Rossio